The 2019 Henrico County Commonwealth's Attorney election was held on November 5, 2019, to elect the Commonwealth's Attorney of Henrico County, Virginia, concurrently with elections to the Senate of Virginia and Virginia House of Delegates. Incumbent Democratic Commonwealth's Attorney Shannon Taylor won reelection to a second term against Republican nominee Owen Conway, a former worker for the office, by a wide margin.

Background and election 
Attorney Shannon Taylor had been serving as the Commonwealth's Attorney since 2012. After her win in the 2011 election, she fired several lawyers in a push for a diverse and different office. One of those was Owen Conway, whom Taylor face opposition with.

During the election, Taylor was accused of bribery from John J. Trak, a convicted felon, during the 2015 election, with Taylor confirming the donation and Conway saying that the donation was "unethical and improper."

Candidates

Republican 
Owen Conway, attorney and former assistant Commonwealth's Attorney (1991–2011)

Democratic 
Shannon Taylor, incumbent Commonwealth's Attorney

Results 
Taylor defeated Conway with a landslide victory, earning 61% of the total vote.

References 

2019 Virginia elections